Personal Identity System (PIS) was established in 1947 to register all Pakistani citizens. The Personal Identity System was replaced by the National Database and Registration Authority in 1972.

After the independence of Pakistan, Prime Minister Liaquat Ali Khan launched the Personal Identity System (PIS) program to registered, managed and issued all national identification cards to the citizens of Pakistan and Muslim refugees settling in Pakistan.

Civil registries
Databases in Pakistan
Government databases
Government of Liaquat Ali Khan